Polyptychus trilineatus, the common crenulate hawkmoth, is a moth of the family Sphingidae. It is known from large parts of South Asia.

Description 
The wingspan is 74–112 mm.

Biology 
The larvae feed on Ehretia species.

Subspecies
Polyptychus trilineatus trilineatus (northern India, Nepal, Myanmar, southern China (Hainan), Thailand and Vietnam)
Polyptychus trilineatus celebensis Clark, 1929 (Sulawesi)
Polyptychus trilineatus costalis Mell, 1922 (southern China)
Polyptychus trilineatus javanicus Gehlen, 1931
Polyptychus trilineatus kelanus Jordan, 1930
Polyptychus trilineatus luteatus Rothschild & Jordan, 1903 (southern India, Sri Lanka)
Polyptychus trilineatus mincopicus Jordan, 1930
Polyptychus trilineatus sonantis Jordan, 1930
Polyptychus trilineatus philippinensis Rothschild & Jordan, 1903 (Philippines)

References

Polyptychus
Moths described in 1888